Mustafa Mahmudov was an Azerbaijani political leader who was instrumental in the nation's independence movement in the early 1900s. He served as a member of parliament for the second Russian State Duma in 1907 and was Deputy Secretary of the Azerbaijani National Council at its initiation in 1918. Mahmudov also was a member of Azerbaijan's Commission on Agriculture. He represented the Musavat political party.

Early life and education 
He was born on 31 January 1878, in Kürdəmir village of Baku Governorate into a peasant family. He received primary education in Kürdəmir and Göyçay, finally enrolling at prestigious Transcaucasian Teachers Seminary, graduating from it in 1899.

Career 
He started his career as a teacher, first working as a school instructor in Vəndam, then moving on to Baku city, working at several schools. Losing his elder brother in 1903, he was forced to look after his children too. He switched to politics in 1907 when he was elected to Second Duma of Russian Empire representing the Baku Governorate from the CDP. An activist for abolition of drumhead court-martials in Russian Empire, he accused Minister of Education, Piotr von Kauffman of neglecting empire's Muslim citizens' education, treating them like a caste.

He briefly returned to pedagogy in 1910 before switching to Musavat and getting elected to Sejm of Transcaucasian Democratic Federative Republic on 9 February 1918. He was Deputy Secretary of the Azerbaijani National Council prior to dissolution of fragile Transcaucasian DFR. He later became member of succeeding Azerbaijani Parliament from 1918 till the end of republic in 1920. He continued teaching career through 1929 and 1934 until his death. He was executed on 20 December 1937 during Great Purge.

Notes

References 

 

1878 births
1937 deaths
People from Kurdamir District
People from Baku Governorate
Musavat politicians
Members of the 2nd State Duma of the Russian Empire
Russian Constituent Assembly members
Azerbaijan Democratic Republic politicians
Great Purge victims from Azerbaijan